Leucania pilipalpis is a species of cutworm or dart moth in the family Noctuidae.

The MONA or Hodges number for Leucania pilipalpis is 10463.

References

Further reading

 
 
 

Leucania
Articles created by Qbugbot
Moths described in 1877